Lion's Heart is a national non-profit, teen-based volunteer program headquartered in California. The organization has several chapters in other states, such as Colorado, Connecticut, Florida, Georgia, Massachusetts, New Jersey, New York, Texas, and Wisconsin. It was founded in 2004 as a non-profit, non-fundraising group designed "to inspire teens to have a positive impact in their communities through leadership and participation in volunteering, providing needed resources for causes that ignite their passions."

Lion's Heart enrolled approximately 5,600+ members as of 2016. The organization has grown steadily to more than 10,000 past and present members as of May 2018. Lion's Heart offers teenagers the opportunity to perform community service without fundraising, gain valuable leadership skills, and create an online shareable portfolio for college applications and internships. The organization enrolls teens who are in 6th through 12th grades. Teen members of Lion's Heart have amassed over 900,400 hours of service to local communities in 28 states in the U.S. since its inception in 2004.

Lion's Heart has become noted in California due to their presence among volunteer groups.

Organization 

Each geographical chapter of Lion's Heart has a group for each gender and grade level. Each group has 3-20 Members, along with one parent who is the Class Coordinator and works as a chaperone. They also now offer individual membership for teens who choose to stay on their own.

The Members elect their own officers, lead their own meetings, decide together what community service they want to perform, and who they want to help. Each 'class' is required to meet six times during a year. Every volunteer in Lion's Heart is encouraged to perform at least 30 hours of community service every year.

While the organization is mostly based around group activity, many members choose to do their community service on their own. The corporate office of Lion's Heart, located in Irvine, California, receives many volunteer requests from nonprofits and those opportunities are passed along to each chapter by the organization's Volunteer Outreach team who also finds and curates unique opportunities for them adding to the enrichment of the local opportunities. The members, both individual and group, have a calendar in their account profile with all volunteer opportunities within 20 miles of their location listed for them that they can choose from.

National presence in the United States 

Presently, as of May 2018, Lion's Heart has 516 groups in 220 chapters across 28 states in the U.S. Cumulatively, Lion's Heart Members have provided more than 900,400 service hours to communities across the nation.

As of 2016, Lion's Heart has 56 chapters grown across ten states in the U.S. Most of the states only have a single chapter, though the group itself notes progressive expansion. Since inception, Lion's Heart Members have provided more than 500,000 service hours.

They have worked with several other volunteer and charity organizations, including the Pediatric Cancer Research Foundation, Education for the Children, Rotary Club, Bethany's Gate, Boys Town, Orange County Food Bank, Ronald McDonald House Charities, Toys for Tots, Make-A-Wish Foundation, National Beach Clean Up — Surfrider Foundation, Capistrano Unified School District, Saddleback Valley School District, Bell Tower Regional Community Center, Pacific Marine Mammal Center Laguna Beach, Rose Parade, Adopt-A-Beach, Zero Trash, Second Harvest Food Bank, Habitat for Humanity, and American Red Cross Blood Drives.

Awards 

Lion's Heart has their own reward system for their members. Members who are active for the entire 6 years are given what is called the 'Golden Lion Award'. At the end of a given year, they will be given a medallion, as well as be honored for their achievements within the organization. (Hours of community service, officer positions held, as well as any other awards they have received.)

Other awards include the Torchbearer Award and nominations for the President's Volunteer Service Award.

The Torchbearer Award goes to a peer-selected Member within each group every year. Once the year is up, the Torchbearer gives their award to the next winner, on, and on. Once the class has reached their senior year, the last person to win it will keep it from then on. It is given to those who give exemplary service by going above and beyond what is required of them. The Torchbearer award was inspired by the founder's late father-in-law Kenton Corwin, who was honored to run with the 1996 Olympic Torch because of his dedication to community service throughout his life.

The President's Volunteer Service Award is a national campaign to recognize community service. Lion's Heart is one of few organizations to be designated a 'leadership' organization by the President's Volunteer Service Award committee and they provide the means for members to qualify by passing along the amount of time that they commit themselves to community activity. There are three levels — gold, bronze, and silver, depending upon how many hours of community service a Member performs in a year. Member's create, within their personal account, a digital portfolio in which to log and track all of their hours, awards, and leadership positions over the course of their membership to share with college, job, and internship applications. Members also have access to college scholarships related to community service.

Community recognition 

Lion's Heart has garnered local appreciation from several communities in which they're based. Members have been honored in Ridgefield CT, North Fulton, Georgia, Mission Viejo CA, as well as many others. The founder, Terry Corwin, has been awarded two PTA Honorary Service Awards (2000, 2007), recognized by the Capistrano United Schools District for helping save the Class Size Reduction Program (2003), named the Grand Marshal of the 4th of July parade in Coto de Caza, CA (2009), and was honored along with her husband, Clay Corwin, with the Distinguished Lifetime Advocates Award by The Education for the Children Foundation (2012). National Philanthropy Day of Orange County, CA, awarded Lion's Heart with the Outstanding Youth Group Award (2009). Terry Corwin was named one of "Twenty Women to Watch" by OC Metro Magazine (2013), appeared on the Katie Couric Show featured in "Women Who Should be Famous" for her work with Lion's Heart (2013), and was presented with The President's Volunteer Service Award for "Lifetime Achievement" (2014), and was award the Daily Point of Light Award (2015).

References

External links 

Official website

Service organizations based in the United States
Organizations established in 2004